Villalba de Rioja is a municipality in the autonomous community of La Rioja (Spain), on the southern slopes of the mountains Obarenes. It borders the provinces of Alava and Burgos. Haro 5 km far from the LR-401. By the municipality elapses Esperamalo stream tributary of the Ebro river.

Interesting places

Buildings and monuments

Casa Palacio of the Ruiz del Castillo 
Documentation known colloquially as "Traspalacio" to be 130 m. east of the headquarters. In the oldest part (cellar,) was born Traspalacio Don Pedro del Castillo in 1521 who later founded the city of Argentina Mendoza and the 1561.

Casa Palacio of Cirac
Casa Palacio that once belonged to the noble family of the Counts of Cirac and Castillofiel Counts.

Other

Memorial to Alvaro Fernandez
There is a monument erected in memory of the cyclist Alvaro Fernandez. You can read some verses of Maria Piedad Mendizabal:
"If you are lucky one day walking around my Rioja ..."

Rollo
The rollo is located in Mendoza City Square.

Hunting ground
In the hunting ground of Villalba de Rioja you can find many species. One can hunt quail, partridge, rabbit, hare, malbiz, the dove. With respect to big game hunting stands hunting wild boar and roe deer (stalking).

Local events
 June 26 and 27, celebrations in honor of San Pelayo. Taking advantage of coinciding with the celebrations of Haro, they also participate in the Battle of Wine. After the Battle of Wine they have lunch in Valtracones, and go to Haro.
 Sunday after the patron saint Nuestra Señora de Haro de la Vega (September 8), they honor their patron virgin Nuestra Señora la Virgen de los Remedios.
Leisure activities
 Hunting (both major and minor).
 The village is one of the starting points for promotion to the Cross Motrico.

Notable people 
 Pedro del Castillo

References

Populated places in La Rioja (Spain)